Manoppello is a comune in Abruzzo, in the province of Pescara, south-eastern Italy. 

It is famous for having a church which contains an image on a thin byssus veil, a sudarium, known as the Holy Face of Manoppello and which has been reputed to be identical to the Veil of Veronica. 

Other sights include is the Romanesque abbey of Santa Maria Arabona.

Twin towns
 Casarano, Italy
 Charleroi, Belgium

References

External links

 Inside Abruzzo - Insider tips uncovered
 Volto Santo di Manoppello Veil, Polish website
 Sudarium Christi The Face of Christ online audio visual featuring texts by sudarium expert Sr. Blandina Paschalis Schlömer et al.
 The Rediscovered Face - 1 first of four installments of an audiovisual presentation relating the holy image with a number of ancient predecessors, YouTube, access date March 2013.

Cities and towns in Abruzzo